Patissa heldi is a moth in the family Crambidae. It was described by E. Hering in 1903. It is found on Sumatra.

References

Moths described in 1903
Schoenobiinae